Kostyantyn Serhiyovych Milyayev (born 23 October 1987 in Novokuznetsk, Russian SFSR) is a Ukrainian platform diver. Milyayev represented Ukraine at the 2008 Summer Olympics in Beijing, where he competed for the men's platform event. He placed twentieth out of thirty divers in the preliminary round, with a total score of 410.20 points after six successive attempts.

References

External links
NBC 2008 Olympics profile

Ukrainian male divers
Russian male divers
Living people
Olympic divers of Ukraine
Divers at the 2008 Summer Olympics
People from Novokuznetsk
1987 births
Universiade medalists in diving
Universiade gold medalists for Ukraine
Medalists at the 2009 Summer Universiade
Sportspeople from Kemerovo Oblast